Takeo may refer to:

Takéo Province, a province of Cambodia
Doun Kaev (town), formerly known as Takéo, the capital of Takéo province
Ta Keo, an Angkorian temple in Cambodia
Takeo, Saga, a city in Saga Prefecture, Japan
Takeo (given name), a masculine Japanese given name
Takeo Doi, a Japanese aircraft designer
Takeo Fukuda, a Japanese politician
Takeo Hatanaka, a Japanese radio astronomer
Takeo Kurusu, a Japanese politician
Takeo Miki, a Japanese politician
Takeo Spikes, a former American football player
Takeo Takahashi, a Japanese former football player
Takeo Takahashi, a Japanese animator
Takeo Yoshikawa, a Japanese spy